The Akron Barberton Cluster Railway  is a Class III railroad that operates on  of track in and around Akron, Ohio.

History 
ABC Railway's beginnings trace back to the organization of the Akron and Barberton Belt Railroad (ABB) which had been formed in the late 19th century. ABB owned  of track in and around Akron, Ohio.

By the 1980s, ABB's traffic had fallen due to a lack of business in the tire industry in Akron.  In 1994, the new Wheeling and Lake Erie Railway purchased the ABB. After the ICC and W&LE signed an agreement and contract in 1993, W&LE made arrangements to form a new railroad in Akron using the former ABB as its basis.

In early 1994, WE created Akron Barberton Cluster Railway (ABCR) from the former ABB assets.  It also included the former Erie main line from Barberton to Rittman and from Kent to Ravenna, Ohio sold by Conrail. In 1997, ABCR was granted permission to tear out 45% the former ABB "Loop" line which looped from the grade in Barberton and Firestone Park to the WE's Brittain Yard in Akron. In 1999, ABCR took the line out of service, and in 2001, they tore the line out completely with expenses paid off by parent railroad company, WE.

Current system 
ABCR has trackage rights on CSX's New Castle Subdivision from the yard in Akron south to Barberton, where it swings off around their headquarters area. ABCR is headquartered in a small building off a local road in Barberton, Ohio.  ABCR uses the restored Erie Railroad line from Barberton to Rittman, Ohio.

In 2002, the railroad acquired the line to the General Electric factory in northern Ravenna, Ohio.  ABCR has purchased trackage rights with METRO Regional Transit Authority in 2006, to connect to the Canton area.

Ohio railroads
Switching and terminal railroads